Like Now is a studio album credited to Kate Ceberano and her Sextet, and released in August 1990. It was Ceberano's second jazz album, following her 1987 live album Kate Ceberano and her Septet; but unlike that album, this was recorded in a studio. It peaked at No. 18 in Australia.

Ceberano won the award for Best Female Jazz Performer at the 1991 Mo Awards.

Background
Following the major success of her 1989 pop album Brave, Ceberano returned to the studio and recorded a jazz album with her sextet.

"Dindi" was released as the only single from the album in August 1990. The song peaked at number 158 on the ARIA Chart.

Critical reception
On 19 October 1990, Adrian Jackson, the director of the Wangaratta Jazz Festival gave the album a positive review in the Business Review Weekly saying; "On her first jazz recording Kate Ceberano and her Septet, she proved that she had a good voice and knew how to swing and have fun. Here, she takes the next step. Not only does she sparkle on songs such as 'Tight' and 'Talk to me Baby', she also sounds as if she knows what she's doing talking about on numbers such as 'You're Blasé', 'Save You Love for Me' and 'Tryin' Times'. Some purists might harbour doubts about Ceberano's credibility as a jazz singer, but this album dispels them. Apart from the vocals, it also offers strong contributions from her band, including some brilliant piano from Jex Saarelaht".

Track listing

 The album was dedicated to the late Dexter Gordon and the late Sarah Vaughan.

Charts
Like Now debuted at No. 47, before peaking at No. 18 in September 1990.

Credits
Produced by Jex Saarelaht, Kate Ceberano, Peter Jones, Philip Ceberano, Robert Burke, Russell Smith and Stuart Speed
Arranged by Peter De Visser
Engineered by Frank Andrewartha (tracks 8, 10 and 12), Peter McLean (tracks 1–7, 9 and 11), Tony Tosti (tracks 8 and 10)

Musicians
Bass: Stuart Speed
Drums: Peter Jones
Guitar: Doug DeVries and Philip Ceberano
Percussion: Dennis Close
Piano: Jex Saarelaht
Saxophone, Flute: Robert Burke
Strings: Cindy Watkin, David Shafer, Fintan Murphy, Jacqui Johnson, Laurence Jacks, Lorraine Hook, Ron Layton, Rudolf Osadnik and Siobhan Statkiewicz
Trumpet, trombone: Russell Smith

References

1990 albums
Kate Ceberano albums
Mushroom Records albums